The Federal University of Technology Owerri (FUTO) is a federal government university in Owerri West, the capital of Imo State, Nigeria. The university is bounded by the communities of Eziobodo, Umuchima, Ihiagwa and Obinze. It is the premier federal university of technology in the South-East and South-South parts of Nigeria.

The university is the oldest university of technology in Nigeria and was established in 1980 by executive fiat with the composition and appointment of the first provisional council by Nigeria's first Executive President, Shehu Shagari. It became the first of three such universities set up by the Federal Government of Nigeria which sought to establish a University of Technology in each geo-political region and particularly in a state which did not have a conventional university.

FUTO began with 225 students and 60 staff (28 academic and 32 non-academic). Like other federal universities in Nigeria, FUTO is headed by a Chancellor who is usually a royal father, and followed by a Vice Chancellor who oversees the daily activities of the university.

The University Senate is the highest decision making arm of the university. FUTO students are fondly called Futoites and currently has over 25,000 students. FUTO has over 50 professors. The current vice-chancellor is Professor Nnenna Nnannaya Oti.

History
The university was founded in 1980. It later merged with  Alvan Ikoku College of Education Owerri, absorbing the latter's students.

It is one of the premier technological universities in western Africa. Its student body comprises people from all over west Africa and beyond. It is the only federal university of technology in the south-east of Nigeria, and one of the oldest in West Africa

FUTO has been a partnering university to the Joint Universities Preliminary Examinations Board (JUPEB). JUPEB offers A/Level Programs to Students seeking admission into the Federal University of Technology, Owerri via Direct Entry(DE). FUTO currently admit students into the JUPEB Program Yearly. On 13 April 2021, Prof  Nnenna Oti was elected Vice-Chancellor to replace Francis Chukwuemeka Eze whose tenure expired on 19 June 2021.

Schools
 School of Agriculture and Agricultural Technology (SAAT)
 School of Engineering and Engineering Technology (SEET)
 School of Electrical Systems and Engineering Technology (SESET)
 School of Physical Sciences (SOPS)
 School of Biological Sciences (SOBS)
 School of Logistics and Innovation Technology (SLIT)
 School of Health Technoloy (SOHT)
 School of Environmental Sciences (SOES)
 School of Basic Medical Sciences (SBMS)
School of Information and Communication Technology (SICT)
 College of Medicine and Health Sciences (CMHS)

Institutes and Academic Support Centres 

 Centre for Agricultural Research (CAR)
Centre for Continuing Education (CCE)
Centre for Entrepreneurial and Vocational Studies
Centre for Industrial Studies (CIS)
Centre for Energy and Power Systems Research (CEPSR)
Centre for Research and International Development (CRID) 
Centre for Women, Gender and Development Studies
Information and Communication Technology (ICT)  Centre 
Institute of Erosion Studies (IES)
University Computer Centre (UCC)
Intellectual Property and Technology Transfer Office (IPTTO)
Institute of Environmental Health and Environmental Justice (IEHEJ)

University Library 

The University Library serves as the pivot of academic pursuit. It was opened to students at the Lake Nwaebere  campus on 9 November 1981. The pioneer librarian was Mr Joseph Chike Anafulu. The library has three main blocks: Library Phases II & IV and the E-library.

Inaugural lectures 
The following inaugural lectures have been presented in the university:

Vice-chancellors
 Prof. U.D. Gomwalk (1980–1986)
 Prof. Amah Nduka (1986–1991)
 Prof.C. O.G. Oba (1992–1999)
 Prof. Jude Njoku (2000–2005)
 Prof. C.E.O. Onwuliri (2006–2011)
 Prof.  Chigozie C. Asiabaka (2011–2016)
 Prof. Francis Chukwuemeka Eze (2016–2021)
Prof. Nnenna Oti (2021–

Deputy Vice Chancellors from 1993

Nigerian universities ranking
The National University Commission (NUC), the body responsible for universities in Nigeria, has not done an official ranking of Nigerian universities in over 14 years.

However, FUTO is currently ranked the 24th best university in Nigeria, according to 4icu.org.ng.

Notable alumni

 Chinedum Enyinnaya Orji - Speaker, Abia House of Assembly<ref
 Smart Adeyemi – politician
 Ndubuisi Ekekwe – professor
 Paul Obiefule – football player
 Nnenna Oti – Vice-Chancellor-elect of Federal University of Technology Owerri

References

External links
 Federal University of Technology, Owerri

Owerri
Education in Imo State
 
1980 establishments in Nigeria
Educational institutions established in 1980
Technological universities in Nigeria
Federal universities of Nigeria